The Seafarer 30, also known as the Seafarer Swiftsure 30, is an American sailboat that was designed by McCurdy & Rhodes as a cruiser-racer and first built in 1978.

Production
The design was built by Seafarer Yachts in Huntington, New York, United States between 1978 and 1985, but it is now out of production.

Design
The Seafarer 30 is a recreational keelboat, built predominantly of fiberglass, with teak wood trim. It has a masthead sloop rig, a raked stem, a slightly reverse transom, a skeg-mounted rudder controlled by a wheel and a fixed fin keel or optional centerboard. It displaces  and carries  of lead ballast.

A tall rig was also available, with a mast about  taller than standard.

The boat is fitted with a Japanese Yanmar 2GM or Westerbeke diesel engine.

The boat's galley is located on the port side of the cabin and includes dual sinks and a three-burner alcohol fueled stove. The head is located forward, just aft of the bow "V"-berth and has a hanging locker and two bi-fold privacy doors. Additional sleeping space is provided by the dinette settees, which has a drop-leaf table, plus two large quarter berths aft, providing sleeping space for eight people. A large chart table is located on the starboard side, just forward of the companionway steps.

Ventilation is provided by a two hatches, one in the forward cabin and one in the main cabin and eight opening ports in the head, while two additional cabin ports are fixed. There are also two Dorade vents.

The boat has internally-mounted halyards, with jiffy-reefing and an outhaul, plus a boom lift. The cockpit has two genoa winches and a third winch for the halyards. The mainsheet traveler is mounted on the bridge deck. Two genoa winches are mounted on the cockpit coaming and two halyard winches on the cabin roof.

The design has a PHRF racing average handicap of 181.

See also
List of sailing boat types

Similar sailboats
Annie 30
Aloha 30
Bahama 30
Bristol 29.9
C&C 30
Catalina 30
CS 30
Grampian 30
Hunter 30
Hunter 30T
Hunter 30-2
Leigh 30
Mirage 30
Mirage 30 SX
Nonsuch 30
Pearson 303
S2 9.2
Southern Cross 28
Tanzer 31

References

Keelboats
1970s sailboat type designs
Sailing yachts
Sailboat type designs by McCurdy & Rhodes
Sailboat types built by Seafarer Yachts